Sphaeralcea angustifolia is a species of flowering plant in the mallow family known by the common names copper globemallow and narrow-leaved globemallow. It is native to the southwestern United States as well as northern and central Mexico, where it grows in desert and plateau habitat. It produces many erect stems, approaching three meters in maximum height. It is woolly or felt-like in texture. The gray-green leaf blades are lance-shaped and measure up to about 5 cm long. They have wavy or slightly lobed edges. The leafy inflorescence bears several flowers each with five wedge-shaped orange petals just under 1 cm in length, and yellow anthers.

References

External links

Jepson Manual Treatment
Photo gallery

angustifolia
Plants described in 1831
Flora of Chihuahua (state)
Flora of Kansas
Flora of Central Mexico
Flora of Northeastern Mexico
Flora of Sonora
Flora of the Southwestern United States
Flora without expected TNC conservation status
Taxa named by Antonio José Cavanilles